Sultan Magomedbegovich Aliev (born September 17, 1984) is a retired Russian mixed martial artist and active sambist. A professional from 2011 until 2019, he competed for the UFC and Bellator.

Background
Sultan Aliev was born in Kaspiysk, Dagestan, Soviet Union. He is a Russian of Avar descent and a devout Sunni Muslim. He started in Combat Sambo in 23 years old, on 2009 he won Combat Sambo European Championship in Milan, Italy. On 2010 he received the rank "International Master of Sports in Combat Sambo" After Russian Combat Sambo Nationals 2011 (3rd) and 2012 (2nd), he made his professional MMA debut in ProFC and won the first fight to Sergey Guzev.

Sambo career
On February 5, 2012 Aliev lost to Vyacheslav Vasilevsky on Combat Sambo Russia Championship 2012 Finale (-90 kg) via decision (1–5).

On February 24, 2014 Aliev won against Vasilevsky on Combat Sambo Russia Championship 2014 Finale (-90 kg) via TKO.

On 24 November 2014 Aliev became World Combat Sambo Champion (-90 kg). In finale match he over French Sebastian Libebe via TKO.

In Russian Nationals 2016 he lost to Khadis Ibragimov by knockout in semifinal and retired from  the championship.

Mixed martial arts career

ProFC
Aliev started his MMA career in ProFC in April 2011. He defeated Sergey Guzev on April 9, 2011 at ProFC 14 via unanimous decision.

Aliev defeated Armenian MMA prospect Hracho Darpinyan on July 2, 2011 at ProFC: Union Nation Cup Final via unanimous decision.

Aliev defeated Fuad Gadyrov on September 26, 2011 at ProFC: Grand Prix Global. He won via KO in the second round.

Aliev defeated taekwondo black belt Marcin Elsner on December 10, 2011 at ProFC: Grand Prix Global Finals. He won via TKO in the first round.

Bellator MMA
In 2013, Aliev was announced as one of the participants of the Bellator Season 8 Middleweight tournament.

Aliev debuted on February 14, 2013 at Bellator 89 where he faced Mikkel Parlo in the quarterfinal round.  Aliev won the fight via unanimous decision to advance to the semifinals.

In the semifinals, Aliev faced Doug Marshall on March 7, 2013 at Bellator 92. Despite controlling the fight via his wrestling, Aliev lost via split decision, resulting in his first professional MMA loss.

Ultimate Fighting Championship
On May 7, 2014 it was announced that Aliev had signed a contract with the UFC.

Aliev made his promotional debut against Kenny Robertson in a welterweight bout on January 24, 2015 at UFC on Fox 14. He lost the fight via knockout in the first round.

Aliev was expected to face Hyun Gyu Lim on August 20, 2016 at UFC 202. However, Aliev pulled out of the fight in early August citing a wrist injury and was replaced by promotional newcomer Mike Perry.

Aliev faced Bojan Veličković on December 17, 2016 at UFC on Fox 22. He won the fight via split decision.

Aliev was expected to face Nordine Taleb on 16 December 2017 at UFC on FOX 26. However, Aliev was removed from the card in early December due to alleged visa issues restricting his ability to travel and was replaced by Danny Roberts.

Aliev faced Warlley Alves on May 12, 2018 at UFC 224. He lost the fight via TKO due to a doctor stoppage at the end of the second round.

Aliev was expected to face Lyman Good on November 3, 2018 at UFC 230. However, it was reported on October 19, 2018 that Aliev pulled out from the event citing injury and he was replace by Ben Saunders.

Aliev was expected to face Emil Weber Meek on April 20, 2019 at UFC Fight Night 149. However, on March 3, 2019 it was announced that Meek withdrew from the bout due to undisclosed reasons and was replaced by Keita Nakamura. Aliev won the fight via unanimous decision. Following the bout, Aliev announced his retirement from mixed martial arts competition.

Championships and accomplishments

Sambo
Federation Internationale de Sambo (FIAS)
World Combat Sambo Championships (2014, Chiba)
World Combat Sambo Federation
European Combat Sambo Championships (2012, Moscow)
All-Russian Sambo Federation
Russian Combat Sambo National Championships 3rd (2010, 2011)
Russian Combat Sambo National Championships runner-up (2012)
Russian Combat Sambo National Champion (2014, World team-trials)

Mixed martial arts record

|-
|Win
|align=center|15–3
|Keita Nakamura
|Decision (unanimous)
|UFC Fight Night: Overeem vs. Oleinik 
|
|align=center|3
|align=center|5:00
|Saint Petersburg, Russia
|
|-
|Loss
|align=center|14–3
|Warlley Alves
|TKO (doctor stoppage)
|UFC 224
|
|align=center|2
|align=center|5:00
|Rio de Janeiro, Brazil
|
|-
|Win
|align=center|14–2
|Bojan Veličković
|Decision (split)
|UFC on Fox: VanZant vs. Waterson
|
|align=center|3
|align=center|5:00
|Sacramento, California, United States
|
|-
|Loss
|align=center|13–2
|Kenny Robertson
|KO (punches)
|UFC on Fox: Gustafsson vs. Johnson
|
|align=center|1
|align=center|2:42
|Stockholm, Sweden
|
|-
|Win
|align=center|13–1
|Charles Andrade
|TKO (punches)
|MMA Star in the Ring: Shamil vs Renat
|
|align=center|2
|align=center|1:56
|Makhachkala, Russia
|
|-
|Win
|align=center|12–1
|Ruslan Khaskhanov
|TKO (punches)
|Fight Nights: Battle on Terek
|
|align=center|1
|align=center|2:28
|Grozny, Russia
|
|-
|Win
|align=center|11–1
|Kleber Bagunça
|KO (punch)
|World Ultimate Full Contact 2013
|
|align=center|1
|align=center|0:28
|Lamego, Portugal
|
|-
|Win
|align=center|10–1
|Viktor Kiyko
|TKO (punches)
|World Ultimate Full Contact 2013
|
|align=center|1
|align=center|2:22
|Lamego, Portugal
|
|-
|Loss
|align=center|9–1
|Doug Marshall
|Decision (split)
|Bellator 92
|
|align=center|3
|align=center|5:00
|Temecula, California, United States
|
|-
|Win
|align=center|9–0
|Mikkel Parlo
|Decision (unanimous)
|Bellator 89
|
|align=center|3
|align=center|5:00
|Charlotte, North Carolina, United States
|
|-
|Win
|align=center|8–0
|Arunas Vilius
|TKO (punches)
|New FC: Battle of the Stars
|
|align=center|1
|align=center|N/A
|Makhachkala, Russia
|
|-
|Win
|align=center|7–0
|Alexei Varagushin
|TKO (punches)
|WH: Igor Vovchanchyn Cup
|
|align=center|1
|align=center|N/A
|Kharkiv, Ukraine
|
|-
|Win
|align=center|6–0
|Vladimir Fedin
|TKO (punches)
|WH: Igor Vovchanchyn Cup
|
|align=center|1
|align=center|N/A
|Kharkiv, Ukraine
|
|-
|Win
|align=center|5–0
|Luis Henrique
|TKO (punches)
|Revolution FC 1: Beirut
|
|align=center|2
|align=center|2:30
|Beirut, Lebanon
|
|-
|Win
|align=center|4–0
|Marcin Elsner
|TKO (punches)
|ProFC: Grand Prix Global Finals
|
|align=center|1
|align=center|1:53
|Rostov-on-Don, Russia
|
|-
|Win
|align=center|3–0
|Fuad Gadyrov
|KO (punch)
|ProFC Grand Prix Global: Caucasus
|
|align=center|2
|align=center|3:24
|Derbent, Russia
|
|-
|Win
|align=center|2–0
|Hracho Darpinyan
|Decision (unanimous)
|ProFC: Union Nation Cup Final
|
|align=center|3
|align=center|5:00
|Rostov-on-Don, Russia
|
|-
|Win
|align=center|1–0
|Sergey Guzev
|Decision (unanimous)
|ProFC: Union Nation Cup 14
|
|align=center|2
|align=center|5:00
|Rostov-on-Don, Russia
|

See also
 List of current UFC fighters
 List of male mixed martial artists

References

External links
 
 

1984 births
Dagestani mixed martial artists
Middleweight mixed martial artists
Living people
People from Derbent
Avar people
Russian expatriates in the United States
Russian male mixed martial artists
Russian sambo practitioners
Ultimate Fighting Championship male fighters
Mixed martial artists utilizing sambo
Mixed martial artists utilizing freestyle wrestling
Russian Sunni Muslims